The Last Days on Earth is a 20/20 science special which aired on ABC in August 2006 and has been aired on  The History Channel.

The show counts down the seven most likely ways in which human life could end, including gamma-ray bursts (GRBs), black holes, AI takeover, supervolcanoes, asteroids, nuclear warfare (atomic warfare), plague, and climate change (global warming). It includes input from a number of scientists including Michio Kaku, Neil deGrasse Tyson, Stephen Hawking and Kevin Warwick. In 2007 it received an Emmy nomination for its graphic and artistic design.

The Disasters
These are organized from least likely to most likely:

See also
Global catastrophic risk
Doomsday Clock ("100 seconds to midnight")

References

External links

2000s American television specials
2006 television specials
2006 in American television